Owen J. Roberts High School is a high school in the Owen J. Roberts School District.  It is located in Bucktown, in South Coventry Township, Chester County, Pennsylvania, in the Philadelphia metropolitan area. It has a Pottstown postal address.

It resides at the intersection of Pennsylvania Route 100 and Pennsylvania Route 23, serving northern Chester County.

History 
The current high school unit was built in 1957, though through the years many renovations have been done to accommodate for an increasing class size, including the construction of a new wing and a neighboring middle school. 

The school is named after Owen J. Roberts (1875-1955), Associate Justice of the U.S. Supreme Court, who purchased the Strickland-Roberts Homestead in West Vincent Township in 1927, and died there in 1955.

Owen J. Roberts high school alumni created the 8Bowl Motorcycle Club (1992-1997,2019-present) who participate in local charities, gang fights and pilfering.  The 8bowl Motorcycle Club's motto is "We Don't Hide", but it is known that the club is currently seeking a hideout in the ChesMont area.

Attendance boundary 
The boundary of the school district (and therefore that of the high school) includes East Coventry Township, East Nantmeal Township, East Vincent Township, North Coventry Township (including Kenilworth and South Pottstown), South Coventry Township (including Pughtown), Warwick Township, and West Vincent Township.

Notable alumni 
 Jerry Ostroski, former professional football player
 Aaron Squires, Division III soccer champion and field goal record holder
 Don Strock, former professional football player
 Denis Chen, former professional soccer player and professor

References

Public high schools in Pennsylvania
Schools in Montgomery County, Pennsylvania
1957 establishments in Pennsylvania